The North American, Central American and Caribbean Championships is a continental track and field athletics event organised by the North American, Central American and Caribbean Athletic Association. The last of the six IAAF areas to hold a continental senior athletics competition, the NACAC Championships' inaugural edition was held in 2007 in San Salvador, El Salvador. Three hundred athletes competed at the 2007 Championships and a total of 26 nations were represented. The United States dominated the first edition with a total of 43 medals, including 28 gold medals. Mexico and Trinidad and Tobago took second and third places with totals of 20 and 11 medals, respectively.

Editions

Records

Men

Women

Mixed

Medal table

References

External links
NACAC official site
2007 Medal table
NACAC Junior results at gbrathletics

 
NACAC competitions
International sports championships in the Americas
Biennial athletics competitions
Recurring sporting events established in 2007
Continental athletics championships